The Hungary national junior handball team is the national under-20 handball team of Hungary. Controlled by the Hungarian Handball Federation that is an affiliate of the International Handball Federation IHF as well as a member of the European Handball Federation EHF,The team represents Hungary in international matches.

History

IHF Junior World Championship record
 Champions   Runners up   Third place   Fourth place

EHF European Junior Championship 
 Champions   Runners up   Third place   Fourth place

Squad
Last world championship
 1 NAGY Martin
 2 TOTH Peter
 5 KERKOVITS Gyula
 7 UBORNYAK David
 8 CSOMOR Tamas
 13 KECSKES Danie
 16 GYORI Kristof
 18 SPEKHARDT Gergo
 20 GABOR Marcell
 21 SZITA Zoltan
 26 KRISTOF Matyas
 27 SZUCS Bence
 44 SCHAFFER Zsolt
 45 ROSTA Miklos
 48 BORZAS Uros
 99 MATHE Dominik

References

External links
World Men's Youth Championship table
European Men's Youth Championship table

Handball in Hungary
Men's national junior handball teams
Handball